Joaquín Martínez (November 5, 1930 – January 3, 2012) was a Mexican-born American film, theatre and television actor. Often appearing in Westerns, Martínez had roles in Jeremiah Johnson, in which he played a Crow chief, and Ulzana's Raid, which was directed by Robert Aldrich and co-starred Burt Lancaster.

Martínez was often typecast in roles that stereotyped Latinos, Native Americans, and Mexicans, but he frequently changed and reworked his characters through his acting, sometimes causing tensions with a production's director.

Early life
Martínez was born on November 5, 1930, in Cozumel, Mexico. At the time of his death in 2012 his oldest living sister, Guadalupe Martinez, resided in San Diego, CA. His other living sister, Elvira, resided in Glendale, CA. His interest in acting led him to study method acting under Seki Sano.

Career
His professional breakthrough came in the 1967 Mexican dramatic film, Pedro Páramo, which was directed by Carlos Velo and premiered at the Cannes Film Festival that same year. He moved to Los Angeles, California, shortly after making Pedro Páramo, where he worked as a professional film, television and stage actor for more than thirty years.

In Jeremiah Johnson, which was set in the American West shortly after the Mexican American War, Martínez's and Robert Redford's characters come into conflict, but come to an understanding and peace in the film's silent, unspoken finale. In addition to Jeremiah Johnson and Ulzana's Raid, both released in 1972, Martínez was cast opposite Anthony Quinn and Kevin Costner in the 1990 movie, Revenge, as well as the 1993 film, The House of the Spirits. Martínez's appearance in Revenge reportedly fulfilled a longtime dream to work with Anthony Quinn, who was also originally from Mexico.

Film director Lee Tamahori specifically cast Martínez in the James Bond film, Die Another Day, due to his performance in the Ulzana's Raid. Martínez was cast by Tamahori in 2001 and Die Another Day was released in 2002.

Martínez often appeared in western films, television, and miniseries, such as Stones for Ibarra, Centennial, How the West Was Won, and Ishi: The Last of His Tribe in 1978. He guest-starred in Death Valley Days, Gunsmoke, Bonanza, and The High Chaparral. Martínez's guest roles in non-western series included Quincy, M.E., Northern Exposure, L.A. Law, Marcus Welby, M.D., Dynasty, Ironside, and opposite Bill Cosby in The Bill Cosby Show.

On stage, Martínez was an original cast member for Zoot Suit, which broke sales records for live theater when it opened in Los Angeles in July 1978. In 1988, he co-starred in Summer and Smoke with Christine Lahti and Christopher Reeve at the Ahmanson Theatre in Los Angeles.

Martínez's last film was Castingx, a 2005 Dutch movie directed by Ad Bol.

Personal life
He lived in semi-retirement in the Netherlands since approximately 2002 or 2003.

Death
Joaquin Martínez died from pancreatic cancer at his home in Everdingen, the Netherlands, on January 3, 2012, at the age of 81. He was survived by his wife, Marja Valkestijn; daughter, Jennifer; son, Christopher; stepson, Sjoerd; and his former wife, Mary Preston.

Filmography

Tlayucan (1962) – Amigo de Eufemio
El señor Tormenta (1963) 
Tesoro de mentiras (1963)
Pedro Páramo (1967) – Abundio
Alma Grande en el desierto (1967)
El asesino se embarca (1967) – Pedro
The Bandits (1967)
The Stalking Moon (1968) – Julio
Lauro Puñales (1969) – Matías
Moonfire (1970) – Lazaro
Jeremiah Johnson (1972) – Paints His Shirt Red
Joe Kidd (1972) – Manolo
Ulzana's Raid (1972) – Ulzana
Executive Action (1973) – Art Mendoza
Zandy's Bride (1974) – Arvis Demas (uncredited)
He Is My Brother (1975) – The Kahuna
Who'll Stop the Rain (1978) – Angel
Meatballs Part II (1984) – Indian Chief
Flashpoint (1984) – Pedroza
Little Treasure (1985) – Market Voice #2
Persecución en Las Vegas: 'Volvere''' (1987) – TonyRevenge (1990) – MauroHouse of Cards (1993) – SelordThe House of the Spirits (1993) – SegundoThe Cowboy Way (1994) – Nacho SalazarThe Odd Couple II (1998) – Truck DriverDie Another Day (2002) – old man Cigar FactoryCastingx'' (2005) – Postman (final film role)

References

External links

1930 births
2012 deaths
American male film actors
American male stage actors
American male television actors
American male actors of Mexican descent
Male actors from Los Angeles
Mexican emigrants to the United States
Male actors from Quintana Roo
People from Cozumel
People from Vianen